Shexian North railway station is a railway station in Shexian County, Huangshan, Anhui, China. It is an intermediate stop on both the Hefei–Fuzhou high-speed railway and the Hangzhou–Huangshan intercity railway. 

Initially, no station was planned at this location. However, the station was later added to plans. The station opened with the Hefei–Fuzhou high-speed railway on 28 June 2015.

References 

Railway stations in Anhui
Railway stations in China opened in 2015